Petrus Gonsalvus (Tenerife – c. 1618, Capodimonte), referred to by Ulisse Aldrovandi as "the man of the woods", became famous during his lifetime because of his condition, hypertrichosis. His life at various courts in Italy and France has been well chronicled.

Biography

Gonsalvus first came to the court of Henry II, King of France in 1547, and was sent from there to the court of Margaret of Parma, regent of the Netherlands.  He married while there.  Later, he was moved into the court of Alexander Farnese, Duke of Parma.  Four of his seven children were also afflicted with hypertrichosis universalis and painted.  His family became an object of medical inquiry by Ulisse Aldrovandi among others.  Despite living and acting as a nobleman, Gonsalvus and his hairy children were not considered fully human in the eyes of their contemporaries. Gonsalvus eventually settled in Italy with his wife.  The last known record of him is from 1617, when he was listed among those who had attended his grandson's christening. It is believed the marriage between Petrus Gonsalvus and Lady Catherine may have partially inspired the fairy tale Beauty and the Beast.

He died in 1618 in Capodimonte near Rome.

Chamber of Art and Curiosities, Ambras Castle
The Chamber of Art and Curiosities, Ambras Castle collection in Innsbruck, Austria has a painting of Pedro González (Petrus Gonsalvus) as well as other people who display an extreme form of hirsutism, also called Ambras syndrome in 1933 in reference to its depiction at this collection.

References

External links 
 
Petrus Gonsalvus

1537 births
1618 deaths
People from Tenerife
People with hypertrichosis
16th-century German people